Aetna Township is located in Logan County, Illinois. As of the 2010 census, its population was 535 and it contained 228 housing units. Chestnut, Illinois and Bakerville, Illinois are the only communities in the township.

Aetna Township most likely derives its name from Mount Etna.

Geography

Demographics

References

External links
US Census
City-data.com
Illinois State Archives
Township Website

Townships in Logan County, Illinois
Townships in Illinois